The Saifai Airstrip is an airstrip in Saifai tehsil of Etawah District, Uttar Pradesh with only unscheduled chartered flights. This airstrip has an existing land area of 370 acres and it is suitable for Airbus 320/Boeing 737 with turning pads at both ends.

Airlines and destinations 
The airport/airstrip has only unscheduled chartered flights.

Indian Air Force practice exercises

2015
In 2015, Mirage 2000 aircraft of Indian Air Force performed emergency situation tests from the airstrip.

2018
In 2018, Indian Air Force did their second practice exercise at Saifai Airstrip during operation Gagan Shakti 2018.

References

External links
 

Airports in Uttar Pradesh
Saifai
Buildings and structures in Etawah district
Transport in Saifai
Airports with year of establishment missing